This is a list of artificial objects reentering Earth's atmosphere by mass (see space debris). Such objects are often completely destroyed by reentry heating, but large enough objects or components can survive.  Most of the objects which reenter are relatively small; larger objects have survived but usually break up into smaller pieces during reentry.

The list includes group entries for the 134 Space Shuttle external tanks used between 1981 and 2011. During Space Shuttle launches, the tanks reached space without reaching orbit and re-entered the atmosphere, breaking apart before impacting the ocean. The tanks were also not necessarily completely empty when discarded.

Many other launch systems have discarded spent stages into space, but not all stages go into orbit or even reach space (by passing the Kármán line). For example, the Space Shuttle side boosters did not reach space, as the highest altitude reached during their flight was only about 220,000 feet (67 km).

Examples of heaviest re-entering spacecraft or components

See also
 Center for Orbital and Reentry Debris Studies
 Space Shuttle external tank
 List of heaviest spacecraft
 List of space debris producing events

References

Space debris
Space debris